Carabus dufouri dufouri is a subspecies of black coloured beetle from family Carabidae, found on Gibraltar and in Spain.

References

dufouri dufouri
Beetles described in 1829
Fauna of Gibraltar